William, Bill, Billy or Willie McCartney can refer to:

Bill McCartney (born 1940), American evangelist and former football coach
Billy McCartney (born 1947), Scottish footballer
William McCartney (footballer), Scottish footballer (fl. 1902–1903)
Willie McCartney (died 1948), Scottish football manager
John McCartney (footballer, born 1866) (William John McCartney, 1866–1933), British footballer

See also
William Macartney (disambiguation)
William McCartney Davidson (1872–1942), Canadian journalist, politician, and author